The NZR RM class Model T Ford railcar was a type of rail motor that operated on New Zealand's national rail network. Only two were built, classified as RM 4 and RM 5, and they were experimental railcars designed in an attempt to offer improved passenger services on quiet country branch lines that served regions with small populations.

Technical details

The engine and transmission used for Ford Model T cars served as the basis of these railcars, which came to resemble a red box on wheels. At the front of the railcar, a small front hood extended out from the boxy compartment and housed the engine, and from the bonnet hung large pannier bags for luggage. It was designed so that one person could operate it rather than three that were required for a conventional carriage train.

Operation

Greytown Branch

After being built in 1925–26 at the Hutt Workshops in Petone, the railcars were sent to the Greytown Branch in the Wairarapa for trials. The Greytown Branch was a short line that provided a link between the town of Greytown and the Wairarapa Line, which bypassed the town by some four kilometres. Services ran from Greytown to connect with services on the Wairarapa Line at the junction in Woodside, but they were woefully underpatronised; often, the steam locomotive working the service would pull just a guard's van and a single passenger carriage carrying a handful of passengers. The costs to operate such a service meant that the line made a significant financial loss, but it was hoped that the small Model T Ford railcars would slash operating costs while providing a satisfactory service for the travellers who did use the line. Unfortunately, they did not prove as successful or as popular as hoped, so, after their trial period, steam-hauled carriage trains were reinstated for all services and the railcars were sent to work in Southland.

Southland branches

In Southland, the Model T Ford railcars were assigned to the Waikaia and the Wyndham (Glenham) branches and began operating in late May 1926. These two lines were similar in some ways to the Greytown Branch; although they did not have multiple shuttle services to connect with mainline trains, they served small towns with insufficient demand for locomotive-hauled carriage passenger trains. Previously, the two lines had been served by mixed trains that carried both passengers and freight, and as they had to load and unload freight along the way, trip times were slow and thus unpopular. It was hoped the Model T Ford railcars would rejuvenate traffic and provide some measure of profitability, especially on the section of the Wyndham Branch from Wyndham to Glenham, which was so underutilised that it was facing closure.

The Model T Ford railcars worked on the two branch lines for the latter half of the 1920s, but not to any notable degree of success. This was in part due to their wheel arrangement; bogies give a more comfortable ride than the two separate axles used by these particular railcars. The railcars were also prone to overheating as the luggage bags hung from the bonnet blocked the motor's ventilation, and this led some members of the public to nickname the railcars "tea pots" or "coffee pots". Other nicknames were "glasshouses" and "pie carts". On the Waikaia Branch, the Model T Ford railcars were unpopular with the local residents and were neither successful themselves nor able to generate enough traffic to warrant replacement with a more popular carriage service. On the Wyndham Branch, they failed to achieve the desired success as well, and were unable to keep the section from Wyndham to Glenham open. The line to Glenham was closed on 14 July 1930, and the railcars were removed from service the next year. Their retirement meant that the numbers RM 4 and RM 5 were free to be re-used later – in 1936 they were allocated to the first two Wairarapa railcars, the second truly successful railcar type in New Zealand (after the Midland class).

Preservation

A replica was built by the Pleasant Point Museum and Railway and is a popular attraction. Its popularity is enhanced by the fact that while Model T Ford railcars and railbuses of various types were built around the world, it is one of only two replicas in the world. During summer and other holiday seasons, it runs services from Pleasant Point station multiple times daily. The railcar was given the number RM 4 by the Railway and was built between 1981 and 1999 by volunteers.

Recently, the body of Model R Ford railcar, RM 5 (not to be confused with Wairarapa railcar, RM 5) was discovered on a property in Southland. In 2018 it was gifted to the Pleasant Point Museum and Railway and was moved there soon after. There are currently no plans associated with RM 5. The final resting place for RM 4 is unknown.

References

Bibliography

External links
Pahiatua Railcar Society: Early New Zealand Railcars - the Model T Fords are featured under the heading "RM 4 and 5" 
Pleasant Point Museum and Railway, including an article about their Model T Ford railcar replica 
Another photo of the preserved Model T Ford railcar, from an article about the Pleasant Point Museum and Railway

Railcars of New Zealand
Rail transport in New Zealand
Railmotors